Basting is a cooking technique that involves cooking meat with either its own juices or some type of preparation such as a sauce or marinade. The meat is left to cook, then periodically coated with the juice.

Prominently used in grilling, rotisserie, roasting, and other meat preparations where the meat is over heat for extended periods of time, basting is used to keep meat moist during the cooking process and also to apply or enhance flavor. Improperly administered basting, however, may actually lead to the very problem it is designed to prevent: the undesired loss of moisture (drying out) of the meat.

If not compensated by countermeasures, the opening of the oven door and the resulting loss of temperature and moisture content of the air circulating inside can lead to increased evaporation from the meat surfaces.

To prevent this, the easiest solution is to place the meat in a closed oven bag, which traps evaporating moisture and does not let it disseminate into the oven space and then out to the kitchen.  The meat is "auto-basted" when the air trapped inside the bag reaches the point of its maximum possible moisture content, and the resulting precipitate forms into drops on the surfaces of the meat or the wall of the bag. The drops roll down to the lowest point of the closed space, where the meat sits and cooks in the resulting juices.  This technique often requires minimal or no added liquids other than what the meat already contains, for loss of moisture is virtually negligible from inside the bag. Perhaps even better, some oven pans are designed to carry a lid.

Other alternatives include allowing extended cooking time, administering increased amounts of juices, coating the meat with moisture rich fruits or fat-rich cuts, such as bacon, or actual fat, place moisture rich fruits and vegetables around the cooking meats, and if possible, using a convection oven.

This is a type of cooking usually recommended for dishes that generally taste mild, but are served with sauces that provide complementing or overpowering flavor to them, for example chicken chasseur.

Basting is a technique generally known to be used for turkey, pork, chicken, duck, and beef (including steak), but may be applied to virtually any type of meat.

See also
Kitchen utensil
Pastry brush

References

External links
How Stuff Works - Basting

Cooking techniques
Culinary terminology